Arthur William Crawford "Tony" Morgan (born 24 August 1931) is a British sailor who competed in the 1964 Summer Olympics.

Tony Morgan was born in Rochford, Essex. At the 1964 Olympics he sailed together with Keith Musto in the Flying Dutchman Lady C. They finished second in their class and were awarded silver.

Morgan and Musto won the European Flying Dutchman Championship in 1964 and finished second in 1966. Following their Olympic success Morgan and Musto were jointly named Yachtsman of the Year by the Yachting Journalists' Association in 1964. Morgan was a member of the Council of the Royal Yachting Association from 1968 to 1972 and a member of the British Olympic Yachting Appeal from 1970 to 1972. 
   
Following his yachting career Morgan served as director and chairman in several venture capital trusts and renewable energy companies, such as Purle Bros, Redland, Morgan Hemingway, Wimpey Waste Management, Wistech, Re-Energy, and Octopus Investment. He was a member of the Board of Governors of the BBC from 1972 to 1977, as well a member of the Campaign for Social Democracy and the National Committee for Electoral Reform during the 1970s. From 1984 to 1989 he served as chairman of the Hunger Project Trust. In 1992 he was appointed Chief Executive of The Industrial Society a post he held until 2000. He has been Chairman of the charity Youth at Risk since 1992.

References

1931 births
Living people
British male sailors (sport)
Olympic sailors of Great Britain
Sailors at the 1964 Summer Olympics – Flying Dutchman
Olympic silver medallists for Great Britain
Olympic medalists in sailing
People from Rochford
BBC Governors
Medalists at the 1964 Summer Olympics
English Olympic medallists